The New York metropolitan area has the busiest airport system in the United States and the second busiest in the world after London. It is also the most frequently used port of entry and departure for international flights. In 2011, more than 104 million passengers used the airports under the auspices of the Port Authority of New York and New Jersey (PANYNJ). The number increased to 117 million in 2014.

The metro area is served by three major airports, John F. Kennedy International Airport (JFK), Newark Liberty International Airport (EWR) and LaGuardia Airport (LGA), which have been operated by the Port Authority since 1947. The International Air Transport Association airport code (IATA code) "NYC" is reserved to refer to these three airports. JFK and Newark are connected to regional rail systems by AirTrain JFK and AirTrain Newark respectively.

The class B airspace used by the three airports is extremely congested. Despite caps placed by the Federal Aviation Administration (FAA) limiting the number of flights per hour, they rank among the top five in the United States for delays. In 2012, travel guide Frommer's rated three terminals in the region as the worst in the world: JFK Terminal 3, Newark Terminal B and LGA's US Airways terminal. It rated Terminal 5 at JFK as the best in the U.S. The metro area airports also ranked low in 2017 consumer surveys.

In addition to JFK, EWR, and LGA, there are satellite or reliever airports in the metro area which provide additional commercial air carrier service, albeit on a much smaller scale, as well as numerous general aviation airports, heliports, and seaplane bases.

History
Teterboro Airport is the oldest operating airport in the New York metropolitan area. Walter C. Teter (1863–1929) acquired the property in 1917.
While other localities had municipal airports, New York City itself had a multitude of private airfields, and thus did not see the need for a municipal airport until the late 1920s. Flushing Airport opened in 1927, quickly becoming the city's busiest airport; it closed in 1984. Newark Liberty International Airport opened in 1928. It was followed by Floyd Bennett Field in 1930; New York City's first municipal airport, it was built largely in response to the growth of commercial aviation after World War I. LaGuardia Airport was opened in 1939, and Floyd Bennett Field was closed for general aviation two years later. John F. Kennedy International Airport opened as Idlewild Airport in 1948.

The Cradle of Aviation Museum, the Aviation Hall of Fame and Museum of New Jersey, and Newark Metropolitan Airport Buildings all preserve the history of aviation in the New York metro area.

Airspace
The vast majority of airspace above the metropolitan area is controlled by the Federal Aviation Administration (FAA) and split into complex sectors which organize the flow of inbound and outbound flights to and from the area's many airports, as well as transitory air traffic between neighboring regions.

 New York TRACON (N90), located in Westbury, Long Island, is one of seven large terminal radar approach control units in the United States. Its controllers primarily service low-altitude traffic operating among, and around, New York City's Class B airports and their satellites.
 New York Center (ZNY), located in Ronkonkoma, Long Island, is one of 22 Air Route Traffic Control Centers (ARTCC) in the United States. The unit originally existed at JFK Airport, before moving in July 1963 to a purpose-built site in Suffolk County. The new Cold War-era facility was designed to resist the effects of a hypothetical nuclear attack.

Regulations are in effect in the airspace where flight is permitted under visual flight rules (VFR), the East River VFR corridor and the Hudson River VFR corridor. The southern end of both begins at the Verrazano-Narrows Bridge. The corridor along the Hudson River allows VFR flight along the entire length between Manhattan and the New Jersey Hudson Waterfront north to the Alpine Tower, while that along the East River ends southwest of LGA airspace at the northern end of Roosevelt Island.

As of 2014, about 1% of flights to the Port Authority-controlled airports use the Next Generation Air Transportation System, which relies on the Global Positioning System instead of radar.

Major commercial airports

John F. Kennedy International Airport

John F. Kennedy International Airport (JFK) is the major entry point for international arrivals in the United States, and it is the largest international air freight gateway in the nation by value of shipments. Sections of the airport have been a foreign trade zone since 1984. About 100 airlines from more than 50 countries operate flights to JFK. The JFK–London Heathrow route is the leading U.S. international airport pair with over 2.9 million passengers in 2000. Other top international destinations from JFK are Charles de Gaulle Airport in Paris, Incheon International Airport in Seoul, Barajas Airport in Madrid, Ben Gurion International Airport in Tel Aviv, Cibao International Airport in Santiago de los Caballeros, Las Américas International Airport in Santo Domingo, Frankfurt Airport in Frankfurt, Narita and Tokyo International Airports in Tokyo, Changi Airport in Singapore, and Guarulhos International Airport in Sao Paulo. The airport is located along Jamaica Bay near Howard Beach, Queens. The elevated AirTrain JFK people mover system connects JFK to the New York City Subway and the Long Island Rail Road.

Newark Liberty International Airport
Opened in 1928, Newark Liberty International Airport (EWR) is considered the first major commercial airport in North America. Amelia Earhart dedicated the Newark Metropolitan Airport Administration Building in 1935. It is the fifth busiest international air gateway. and the busiest in the region in number of flights. In 2003, Newark became the terminus of the world's longest non-stop scheduled airline route, Continental's service to Hong Kong. In 2004, Singapore Airlines broke Continental's record by starting direct 18-hour flights to Singapore. The top three international destinations from Newark are London, Toronto and Tel Aviv. It connects to NJ Transit commuter trains and Amtrak intercity trains via the AirTrain Newark monorail. In 2022, the International Air Transport Association removed Newark from the NYC city code.

LaGuardia Airport
LaGuardia Airport (LGA), the smallest of the New York area's primary airports, handles domestic air service and flights to Canada. It is named for Fiorello H. La Guardia, the city's Depression-era mayor known as a reformist and strong supporter of the New Deal.

In 1984, a "perimeter rule" was introduced to reduce congestion, which prohibits incoming and outgoing flights that exceed 1,500 miles (2,400 km) except on Saturdays, when the ban is lifted, and to Denver, Colorado, which has a grandfathered exemption. As a result, most transcontinental and international flights use JFK and Newark (although there are short-haul international flights to the Canadian cities of Toronto, Montreal and Ottawa).

Plans were announced in July 2015 to entirely rebuild LaGuardia Airport itself in a multibillion-dollar project to replace its aging facilities, and this project would accommodate a new AirTrain LaGuardia connection.

Other commercial airports

Long Island MacArthur Airport
It is owned and operated by the Town of Islip, and has been designated by the FAA an official New York airport. This airport is primarily served by low-cost carriers Southwest Airlines, Frontier Airlines, and Breeze Airways to destinations mostly in the southeast.

Stewart International Airport
In 2007, the Port Authority of New York and New Jersey took control of operations at Stewart and has committed $500 million to its upgrade and expansion. From June 2017 to September 2019 Stewart was the only secondary airport in the New York metro area offering flights to Europe. This was enabled by a main runway of over 11,000 feet.

Trenton–Mercer Airport
Trenton–Mercer Airport (TTN) is located in and owned by Mercer County, New Jersey, near Trenton. It began to see a return of scheduled passenger service in 2013, becoming a focus city for Frontier Airlines, servicing 9 nonstop destinations.

Westchester County Airport
It sees service to a dozen destinations, and has seen increases of nearly 100,000 enplanements in the period from 2008 to 2010.

General aviation airports

Republic Airport
Republic Airport (FRG) is a general aviation reliever airport located in East Farmingdale, Long Island, on the border of Nassau and Suffolk counties. It is the busiest general aviation airport in the New York Metropolitan region, primarily serving Long Island and is owned by the New York State Department of Transportation, who contracts its operation to a third-party.

Teterboro Airport
Teterboro Airport (TEB) is a general aviation reliever airport located in the Boroughs of Teterboro, Moonachie, and Hasbrouck Heights in Bergen County, New Jersey. It is owned by the Port Authority of New York and New Jersey, who contracts its operation to a third-party company.

Additional general aviation airports
In addition, there are many smaller general aviation airports, as well as several seaplane bases in the port district and the adjoining region. Among them are:

 Brookhaven Airport (HWV)
 Central Jersey Regional Airport (JVI)
 Danbury Municipal Airport (DXR)
 Essex County Airport (CDW)
 Greenwood Lake Airport (4N1)
 Hackettstown Airport (N05)
 Hudson Valley Regional Airport (POU)
 Igor I. Sikorsky Memorial Airport (BDR)
 Lincoln Park Airport (N07)
 Linden Airport (LDJ)
 Little Ferry Seaplane Base (2N7)
 Meriden Markham Municipal Airport (MMK)
 Monmouth Executive Airport (BLM)
 Morristown Municipal Airport (MMU)
 New York Skyports Inc. Seaplane Base (QNY)
 Newton Airport (New Jersey) (3N5)
 Old Bridge Airport (3N6)
 Princeton Airport (39N)
 Solberg–Hunterdon Airport (N51)
 Somerset Airport (SMQ)
 Trenton–Robbinsville Airport (N87)
 Waterbury–Oxford Airport (OXC)

Heliports
There are numerous heliports located around the New York metro area. Three of the busiest are located in Manhattan:
Downtown Manhattan Heliport, located at the eastern end of Wall Street on Pier 6, on the East River, was the first heliport in the United States to be certified for scheduled passenger helicopter service by the FAA. The heliport was the normal landing spot for US Presidents visiting New York. The soundproof terminal contains gift shops, administrative offices, a VIP lounge and general passenger waiting area, as well as X-ray and bomb-detection machines at a security checkpoint.
East 34th Street Heliport, which consists of a terminal building and fuel filling station and averages 20,000 take-offs and landings each year.
West 30th Street Heliport opened on September 26, 1956. In December of that year, New York Airways began scheduled passenger flights, the first airline flights to Manhattan.

In the late 1960s and again for a short period in the late 1970s, a heliport operated from the roof of the Pan Am Building in midtown Manhattan, before a fatal accident caused it to close.

Seaplanes
Since 2015, New Jersey has largely prohibited the use of seaplanes on navigable waters.
New York Skyports Seaplane Base
Little Ferry Seaplane Base (no fights since 2014)

Capacity and delays
An average of 40% of passenger aircraft delays in the U.S. originated in the New York metropolitan area, some in the area and others due to cascading effects. One-third of aircraft in the national airspace system move through the New York area at some point during a typical day. The three major airports rank among the worst airports for delays the USA despite FAA caps limiting the number of takeoffs and landings per hour to 83 at both JFK and EWR and 71 at LGA. While an increased demand for passengers and freight is foreseen limited land availability in the heavily urbanized area and prohibitive costs constrict expansion of JFK, EWR, and LGA. Approaches to mitigate delays and increase capacity include costly runway expansion projects and greater use of reliever airports. Before the establishment of the Great Swamp National Wildlife Refuge in 1960 the PANYNJ had proposed to build an airport at the location in Morris County, New Jersey but was widely opposed. Studies conducted by the Federal Aviation Administration, the Regional Plan Association, the PANYNJ, and others have identified few sites within the region which would satisfy the requirements for a major airport and evaluated potential dispersion of flights to outlying commercial airports, including Atlantic City International Airport (ACY), Lehigh Valley International Airport (ABE), Bradley International Airport (BDL), and Tweed New Haven Regional Airport (HVN). In July 2013, the PANYNJ took control of ACY.

Defunct airports
The first municipal airport in New York City was Floyd Bennett Field, developed to lure business away from Newark, but it was ultimately unsuccessful as a general aviation airport and became a Naval Air Station in 1941. It is now part of Gateway National Recreation Area. The New York City Police Department leases facilities for their helicopter operations from the National Park Service.

Flushing Airport was another early airport in New York City. It opened in 1927 and was the busiest airport in New York for a time. A decade later it was overshadowed by the larger LaGuardia Airport located nearby. The airport was decommissioned in 1984 after a fatal accident in 1977. Now the area is wetlands owned by the New York City Economic Development Corporation.

Holmes Airport existed in the Jackson Heights section of Queens from 1929 until 1940. It was put out of business by competition from the new LaGuardia Airport, nearby. Naval Air Station Rockaway near Fort Tilden and Miller Field on the South Shore of Staten Island were military airfields facing Lower New York Bay. Rockaway was active in the 1920s, and Miller from 1921 until 1969. Both are part of Gateway National Recreation Area.

See also
List of airports in Connecticut
List of airports in New Jersey
List of airports in New York 
Transportation in New York City

References

External links
New York area aviation chart (VFR Terminal Area Chart) (high-resolution TIFF, ~31 MB)

New York City Metro Area International and Executive Airports

Aviation in New Jersey
Aviation in New York City
Port of New York and New Jersey
Airports by city
Air pollution in New York City